On November 7, 2000, the District of Columbia held a U.S. House of Representatives election for its shadow representative. Unlike its non-voting delegate, the shadow representative is only recognized by the district and is not officially sworn or seated. One-term incumbent Tom Bryant declined to run for reelection and was succeeded by fellow Democrat Ray Browne.

Primary elections
Primary elections were held on September 12. Browne, Thomas, and Olusegun faced no opposition while Shumake did not appear on the primary ballot.

General election
The general election took place on November 7, 2000.

Results

References

Washington, D.C., Shadow Representative elections
2000 elections in Washington, D.C.